Africepheia is a monotypic genus of Malagasy araneomorph spiders in the family Synaphridae containing the single species, Africepheia madagascariensis. It was first described by J. A. Miller in 2007, and is found on Madagascar.

See also
 List of Synaphridae species

References

Monotypic Araneomorphae genera
Spiders of Africa
Synaphridae